is a retired professional boxer from Japan and a former WBA lightweight champion.

Kobori won the Japanese super featherweight title on January 14, 2006 by knocking out Keita Manabe in the second round. He went on to defend it 6 times.

Later, he took on Nicaraguan José Alfaro for the WBA lightweight title on May 19, 2008. Although he was backed against the ropes and counted in the second round, Kobori was able to carry on strong in the fight. In the third round, after doing a lot of defense, Kobori landed a punch which sent Alfaro to the canvass. Alfaro managed to beat the count but was in an unsteady state. Kobori charged to land a series of punches, prompting the referee to wave the fight off. With the win, Kobori became Japan's third world champion at lightweight and first since Takanori Hatakeyama in 2000.

Kobori attempted to defend his title against Paulus Moses on January 3, 2009. He, however, lost the match and the crown by unanimous decision.

While training for his next bout, Kobori developed serious neck and waist problems which prompted him to quit boxing.

See also
List of WBA world champions
List of lightweight boxing champions
List of Japanese boxing world champions
Boxing in Japan

References

External links
 

1981 births
Living people
Lightweight boxers
People from Yotsukaidō
Sportspeople from Chiba Prefecture
World Boxing Association champions
World lightweight boxing champions
Japanese male boxers